Brian Johnson (born November 5, 1995) is a retired American pair skater. With Jessica Calalang, he is a three-time U.S. national silver medalist (2020–22) and a three-time Challenger series medalist, including gold at the 2019 CS Warsaw Cup. 

Earlier in his career, he skated with Chelsea Liu, winning two medals on the ISU Challenger Series. They also competed together at one ISU Junior Grand Prix Final and two World Junior Championships.

Personal life 
Brian Johnson was born November 5, 1995 in Royal Oak, Michigan. His parents, James and Nancy, work in the automotive industry. In 2014, he graduated from Detroit Country Day School.

Career

Early years 
Johnson began skating in 2001. In the 2011–12 season, he competed with Caroline Yu, winning bronze on the intermediate level at the U.S. Junior Championships.

During the next two seasons, he competed with Aya Takai. The pair placed 11th at the 2014 World Junior Championships in Sofia, Bulgaria. They were coached by Jason Dungjen, Sergei Petrovski, Yuka Sato, and Linda Johns in Bloomfield Hills, Michigan.

Partnership with Liu 

Johnson teamed up with Chelsea Liu in May 2014. They are coached by Todd Sand and Jenni Meno in Orange County, California.

During the 2014–15 JGP series, Liu/Johnson won a bronze medal in Dresden, Germany and placed fourth in Zagreb, Croatia. Their results gave them a spot at the 2014–15 JGP Final in Barcelona, Spain, where the pair finished sixth. After winning the junior silver medal at the 2015 U.S. Championships, they were assigned to the 2015 World Junior Championships in Tallinn, Estonia. The pair placed 5th in the short program, 8th in the free skate, and 7th overall.

Competing in the 2015–16 JGP series, Liu/Johnson placed 8th in Linz, Austria and 5th in Toruń, Poland. Ranked fifth in both segments, the pair finished fifth at the 2016 World Junior Championships in Debrecen, Hungary.

Partnership with Calalang

2018–19 season
Johnson partnered with Jessica Calalang in early April 2018. They debuted internationally on the Challenger series at the 2018 CS Autumn Classic International, where they placed fourth. In November, they won bronze at the 2018 CS Tallinn Trophy.  

Debuting at senior Nationals at the 2019 U.S. Championships, they placed fifth.

2019–20 season
After placing sixth at the 2019 CS U.S. Classic, Calalang/Johnson were selected to make their Grand Prix debut, placing fourth at the 2019 Skate America and sixth at 2019 Skate Canada International.  At Skate America, they placed ahead of reigning U.S. national champions Cain/LeDuc.

After competing at a second Challenger event, the 2019 CS Warsaw Cup, where they won the gold medal, Calalang/Johnson competed at the 2020 U.S. Championships.  They were fourth in the short program after Johnson fell on a downgraded triple Salchow attempt.  Skating cleanly in the free skate, they won that segment, receiving an ovation from the audience, and rose to the silver medal place.  Johnson remarked that "the amount of audience support at the end of that program was overwhelming. It’s the most amazing thing I have felt on the ice."

Despite being national silver medalists, Calalang/Johnson were not assigned to one of the United States' two pairs berths at the 2020 World Championships in Montreal.  Instead, they were sent to the 2020 Four Continents Championships in Seoul, where they placed fourth in the short program after Calalang stepped out of their side-by-side jump attempt.  In the free skate, their sole error was Johnson singling a planned triple Salchow, and they placed third in the segment, winning a small bronze medal to finish in fourth place overall.  Johnson commented afterward that they had "been together less than two years, but already we are in the last group at the Four Continents with Olympians.  I have nothing but hope for the future."

After the sudden split of national champions Knierim and Knierim, Calalang and Johnson were added to the World Team. The event was later canceled due to the COVID-19 pandemic.

2020–21 season 
Calalang/Johnson were assigned to compete at the 2020 Skate America, with the Grand Prix operating largely based on training location due to pandemic travel restrictions.  They placed second in the short program despite both making errors on their jumps.  Second in the free skate as well with more jump errors, they won the silver medal behind the new team of Knierim/Frazier.

Competing at the 2021 U.S. Championships, Calalang/Johnson placed second in the short program after Calalang fell on her attempted triple Salchow jump, ending up 6.16 points behind Knerim/Frazier.  The team struggled in the free skate, with Calalang again falling on what was intended as a jump combination and both making errors on their other triple jump, as well as receiving on a level 1 on their final lift. Despite this, they remained in second place, winning their second consecutive silver medal. 

Calalang/Johnson were named to the American team for the 2021 World Championships in Stockholm, but later withdrew for what were initially announced as "personal reasons". Eight months later it was revealed that Calalang had tested positive for 4-CPA, a known metabolite of Meclofenoxate, a stimulant prohibited by the United States Anti-Doping Agency. As a result, their funding from the USFS was temporarily suspended. It was eventually determined that 4-CPA was also metabolized as a result of using various cosmetics and shampoos, and Calalang was cleared to return to competition.

2021–22 season 
Due to the suspension, Calalang/Johnson were not eligible to be assigned to any events on the Grand Prix apart from receiving a host spot at 2021 Skate America after being cleared. They made their debut at the Skating Club of Boston's Cranberry Cup event, winning the bronze medal, before placing fourth at the 2021 CS Finlandia Trophy.

Returning to the Grand Prix at the 2021 Skate America, they placed fourth in the short program with a clean skate, but fell to fifth after the free skate due to multiple jump errors. Calalang/Johnson then competed twice on the Challenger series, winning the silver medal at the 2021 CS Warsaw Cup and then placing sixth at the 2021 CS Golden Spin of Zagreb.

Defending national champions Knierim/Frazier were forced to withdraw from the 2022 U.S. Championships due to a positive COVID-19 test, but were still expected to be named to the American Olympic team. As a result, it was widely considered to be between Calalang/Johnson and Cain-Gribble/LeDuc for the second pairs berth on the team. Calalang/Johnson were narrowly second in the short program with a clean skate, but in the free skate both made jump errors in addition to a throw jump stepout, and they took the silver medal. Both expressed disappointment at the result, but Johnson added "after everything that's happened this year, we are both just so grateful to be here in front of an audience again. It's an experience that at the beginning of the year, we weren't sure we were going to have again."

Johnson announced his retirement from competitive skating on Instagram on April 3, 2022.

Programs

With Calalang

With Liu

With Takai

Competitive highlights 
GP: Grand Prix; CS: Challenger Series; JGP: Junior Grand Prix

With Calalang

With Liu

With Takai

With Yu

References

External links 

 
 

1995 births
American male pair skaters
Living people
Sportspeople from Royal Oak, Michigan
21st-century American people